Lisa Scheenaard (born 5 September 1988) is a Dutch rower.

Rowing

She won the bronze medal at the 2020 Summer Olympics in the double sculls event together with Roos de Jong.

She won a bronze medal at the 2019 World Rowing Championships and a silver medal at the 2020 European Rowing Championships.

Cycling
In 2018, 2020, and 2022 she was the champion at the Dutch Headwind Cycling Championships, held in storm conditions at Oosterscheldekering over an 8.5 km course against the North Sea wind on upright single-speed bikes. In 2018 she battled "Moderate gale" force 7 winds to complete the distance in 20 minutes 28 seconds.  In 2020 she completed the course in 23 minutes 8 seconds while facing "Fresh gale" force 8 (code orange) winds. In 2022 she battled "Moderate gale" force 7 winds to complete the distance in 22 minutes 53 seconds.

References

External links

1988 births
Living people
Dutch female rowers
World Rowing Championships medalists for the Netherlands
European Rowing Championships medalists
Olympic rowers of the Netherlands
Rowers at the 2020 Summer Olympics
Medalists at the 2020 Summer Olympics
Olympic medalists in rowing
Olympic bronze medalists for the Netherlands
20th-century Dutch women
20th-century Dutch people
21st-century Dutch women